"Sascha … ein aufrechter Deutscher" (An upstanding German) is an anti-Nazi song by Die Toten Hosen. It's the first single and the ninth track from the album Kauf MICH!.

The song tells a story about a jobless neonazi, whose hateful activities are sarcastically depicted very "German" and in a neutral light. Also the tune is fun and careless, which contrasts the theme and depiction even more.

Track listing
 "Sascha … ein aufrechter Deutscher" (Frege, Müller/Frege, Müller) – 2:34
 "Alle Jahre wieder" (Every year again) – 1:30
 "Leise rieselt der Schnee" (roughly Quietly falls the snow) – 1:33
 "Frohes Fest" (roughly Merry celebration) (von Holst/Frege) − 3:41

Charts

1992 singles
Die Toten Hosen songs
Songs written by Campino (singer)
1992 songs
Virgin Records singles